Sannerville is a commune in the Calvados department in the Normandy region in northwestern France. On 1 January 2017, it was merged into the new commune Saline, but this merger was undone on 31 December 2019.

Population

See also
Communes of the Calvados department

References

Communes of Calvados (department)
Calvados communes articles needing translation from French Wikipedia